, or Inazuma Eleven GO Chrono Stones in Europe, is a role-playing video game and sports video game for the Nintendo 3DS developed and published by Level-5. It was released on December 13, 2012 in Japan and in Europe on March 27, 2015. There are two versions of the game, Neppuu ("Scorching Wind"), Wildfire in Europe, and Raimei ("Thunderclap"), Thunderflash in Europe. An Inazuma Eleven GO anime and manga based on the game began serialization in CoroCoro Comic, while an anime based on the game produced by OLM started airing on April 18, 2012. The story follows star Matsukaze Tenma (Arion Sherwind in the English dub) his team, Raimon, and mysterious friendly allies who have come from the future, as they use a time machine to journey across history and attempt to prevent mysterious organisation from the future's plans to erase soccer from history.

A sequel, entitled , was released in Japan on December 5, 2013.

Plot
When Matsukaze Tenma returns to Raimon, he finds out that all his teammates and friends are no longer members of the Raimon Soccer Club, as it does not exist anymore. An international organization hell-bent on erasing soccer called El Dorado has sent Alpha, an assassin from the future, as soccer has become a fearsome weapon in the future.

Tenma is saved by Fei Rune and his companion Clark Wonderbot, who comes from 200 years in the future to help Tenma to protect soccer. After they fix the timeline to the original state, Raimon Soccer Club is back, but El Dorado keeps sending assassin teams to destroy Raimon Soccer Club, and so the team go on a quest to assemble The Strongest Eleven in History and collect their aura to strengthen themselves in order to defeat El Dorado.

Gameplay 
Chrono Stone offers several new gameplay aspects.  "Amourfying" turns an avatar into wearable amour, which gives the player full control of the avatar's offensive and defensive power. Completely new to Chrono Stone is "miximax", which allows two characters to transfer their auras between each other. When activated, miximax transforms the player into a "hybrid" of themselves and their miximax partner, allowing them to utilise their partner's power.

References

External links
Official site 

2012 video games
Association football video games
Inazuma Eleven video games
Level-5 (company) games
Nintendo 3DS games
Nintendo 3DS eShop games
Nintendo 3DS-only games
Nintendo games
Role-playing video games
Video games developed in Japan
Video games with alternative versions
Video games scored by Yasunori Mitsuda